Náměšť may refer to:

 Náměšť nad Oslavou, a town in Třebíč District, Vysočina Region, Czech Republic
 Náměšť na Hané, a market town in Olomouc District, Olomouc Region, Czech Republic